Wahrmann is a surname. Notable people with the surname include:

 Israel ben Solomon Wahrmann (? – 1824), Hungarian rabbi and Talmudist
 Judah Wahrmann (1791–1868), rabbi, son of Israel Wahrmann
 Moritz Wahrmann (1832–1892), Hungarian politician, grandson of Israel

Wahrman 

 Abraham David ben Asher-Anshel Wahrman (Buczacz) (1770, Nadworna - 1840, Buczacz)
 Wayne R. (P.) Wahrman, a film editor

See also 
 Warman (disambiguation)

German-language surnames
Jewish surnames
Yiddish-language surnames